Abyssidrilus is a genus of annelids belonging to the family Naididae.

The genus has almost cosmopolitan distribution.

Species:

Abyssidrilus altoides 
Abyssidrilus altus 
Abyssidrilus hessleri 
Abyssidrilus opulentus 
Abyssidrilus potens 
Abyssidrilus profundus 
Abyssidrilus remus 
Abyssidrilus segonzaci 
Abyssidrilus stilus

References

Annelids
Taxa named by Christer Erséus
Animals described in 1992